Zarb Ali (also Romanized as Ẕarb ‘Alī; also known as Qal”eh Naqd ”Ali, Qal‘eh-ye Naqd ‘Alī, Ẕarbeh ‘Alī, and Ẕarbeh‘alī) is a village in Samen Rural District, Samen District, Malayer County, Hamadan Province, Iran. At the 2006 census, its population was 232, in 68 families.

References 

Populated places in Malayer County